Hamilton Sabot (born 31 May 1987 in Cagnes-Sur-Mer) is a French gymnast. He competed for the national team at the 2012 Summer Olympics in the Men's artistic team all-around. He won a bronze medal in parallel bars at the 2012 Summer Olympics.

On 1 January 2013, Sabot was made a Knight (Chevalier) of the French National Order of Merit.

References

1987 births
Knights of the Ordre national du Mérite
French male artistic gymnasts
Gymnasts at the 2008 Summer Olympics
Gymnasts at the 2012 Summer Olympics
Living people
Olympic bronze medalists for France
Olympic gymnasts of France
Olympic medalists in gymnastics
Medalists at the 2012 Summer Olympics
Mediterranean Games silver medalists for France
Mediterranean Games bronze medalists for France
Competitors at the 2009 Mediterranean Games
Sportspeople from Alpes-Maritimes
Mediterranean Games medalists in gymnastics
People from Cagnes-sur-Mer
21st-century French people